Zion is a small commuter railroad station on Metra's Union Pacific North Line located in Zion, Illinois. Parking is available on both sides of the tracks, and one of the parking lots is along South Eden Road at Shiloh Boulevard. As of 2018, Zion is the 185th busiest of Metra's 236 non-downtown stations, with an average of 110 weekday boardings.

The structure at Zion Station is an unmanned decorative shelter. In the building are some seats and also some shelves for book exchange. It also serves as a stop for passengers who visit Illinois Beach State Park.

As of April 25, 2022, Zion is served by six trains in each direction on weekdays, by five inbound trains and seven outbound trains on Saturdays, and by three trains in each direction on Sundays.

Many trains on the Union Pacific North Line do not serve Zion. This limited rail service makes this station an impractical method of reaching Chicago during off-peak hours. Passengers can take the 571 Pace bus which goes to Waukegan.

References

External links
Metra - Zion  station
Station from Shiloh Boulevard from Google Maps Street View

Metra stations in Illinois
Former Chicago and North Western Railway stations
Zion, Illinois
Railway stations in Lake County, Illinois
Union Pacific North Line